Qarah Khan or Qareh Khan may refer to:
Qareh Khan-e Sofla, Khuzestan Province
Qarah Khan, Lorestan
Qareh Khan, Lorestan
Qareh Khan, Markazi
Qarah Khan, Razavi Khorasan
Qarah Khan, West Azerbaijan